Justin Guarini is the self-titled debut album from American Idol season one runner-up Justin Guarini. It was released by RCA Records on June 10, 2003.

Background
In a radio interview, American Idol host Ryan Seacrest,  remarked of Guarini, "Following his season, there was a huge hype surrounding Justin and no one could believe the hysteria. But, everything was new and they weren't quite sure what to do. With a show like American Idol the window of opportunity is very, very small. Also, Justin had creative conflicts with his record company as far as the direction of the album that additionally aided in putting him past that window of opportunity. After the first season, they learned to capitalize on the window of opportunity for non-winners keeping them in the public eye with singles, videos, rushed CDs, etc., something that didn't happen for Justin".

In an interview with MTV, Guarini spoke of the experience saying, "It really has been just Music Industry Education 101. I learned a lot from it ... And it's not a finger-pointing issue to me; I take as much responsibility as I can."

Originally the song "Sorry" was planned as the first single release from the album, but later it was decided that there would be two "first" singles.  "Sorry" was released to MTV and pop radio, while his cover version of "Unchained Melody" was sent to R&B and adult contemporary stations.

Track listing

Personnel
Adapted from AllMusic.

 Kwaku Alston - photography
 Nancy Anderson - background vocals
 Dave Arch - keyboards, orchestral arrangements
 Peer Astrom - arranger, engineer, mixing, producer
 Bag - arranger
 Edwin Bonilla - percussion
 Paul Boutin - engineer
 Henrik Brunberg - assistant engineer
 Nate Butler - vocal arrangement, background vocals
 Kelly Clarkson - duet, guest artist, primary artist
 Luis Conte - percussion
 Clive Davis - executive producer
 Eric Dawkins - background vocals
 Tony Dixon - keyboards
 Nathan East - bass
 David Frank - drums, keyboards, producer, programming, vocal arrangement
 Ryan Freeland - engineer
 Chris Garcia - engineer
 Justin Guarini - primary artist, background vocals
 Dabling Harward - editing
 Havana Hustlers - programming
 Matt Howe - engineer
 Sean Hurley - bass
 Eric D. Jackson - guitar
 Paul Jackson, Jr. - electric guitar
 Janson & Janson - conductor, string arrangements
 Karlin - arranger
 Fridrik Karlsson - guitar
 Steve Kipner - vocal arrangement
 Greg Kurstin - keyboards
 Christian Lantry - photography
 Chris Laws - engineer
 Ricky Lawson - drums
 Jolie Levine-aller - Production Coordination
 Bernard Löhr - mixing assistant, string engineer
 Manuel Lopez - guitar (nylon string)
 Juan Cristobal Losada - engineer
 Steve Mac - keyboards, mixing, producer
 Kev Mahoney - assistant engineer
 Bill Malina - engineer, mixing
 Manny Marroquin - mixing
 Mae McKenna - background vocals
 Lester Mendez - producer
 Oscar Merner - guitar (nylon string)
 Matz Nilsson - mixing
 Larrabee North - mixing
 Jeanette Olsson - background vocals
 Party Man - keyboards
 Steve Pearce - guitar (bass)
 Greg Phillinganes - keyboards, piano
 John Pierce - bass
 Tim Pierce - guitar
 Daniel Pursey - assistant engineer
 Jason Rankins - assistant engineer
 Wade Robson - engineer, mixing, producer, vocal arrangement
 Wayne Rodrigues - drum programming, pro-Tools
 Jesse Rogg - assistant engineer
 Bob Rosa - assistant vocal engineer
 Dave Russell - engineer, mixing
 Robin Sellers - mixing
 Damon Sharpe - engineer, producer
 Joel Shepard - assistant engineer
 Soulshock - arranger, mixing, producer
 Ramón Stagnaro - guitar (nylon string)
 Stockholm Session Orchestra - strings
 Michael Hart Thompson - guitar
 Tuff Singers - background vocals
 Rabeka Tuinei - mixing assistant
 The Underdogs - producer
 Alan Veucasovic - assistant engineer
 Gavyn Wright - strings
 Joe Yannece - mastering

Charts and sales
Justin Guarini debuted at number twenty on the Billboard 200 with first week sales of 57,000 units. As of December 2, 2003 it has sold 143,000 copies in the United States.

References

2003 debut albums
Albums produced by Lester Mendez
Albums produced by The Underdogs
Justin Guarini albums
RCA Records albums
19 Recordings albums